Branislav "Brana" Stamenković (born 17 August 1934) is a Serbian professional basketball coach and former player.

Playing career 
Born in Vukovar, Stamenković began with his basketball career with his hometown team KK Vukovar. During his career he played for Jugoplastika, Crvena zvezda, OKK Beograd, and KK Borovo. Stamenković was a member of the 1975–76 Jugoplastika roster under Petar Skansi that won the FIBA Korać Cup. He retired as a player with Borovo Vukovar.

Coaching career 
After retirement, Stamenković joined a youth system of KK Borovo Vukovar as a head coach. In the 1988–89 season, he became the head coach of the Borovo senior team. In the same season, his team lost to Partizan in the Yugoslav Cup Semifinals.

In 1997, Stamenković moved to Belgrade, Serbia where he continued his career within youth system of clubs such as KK Sava, Mega Basket. Since 2013, he has been youth coach of KK BASK.

Career achievements 
 FIBA Korać Cup  champion: 1 (with Jugoplastika: 1975–76)

References

1954 births
Living people
Croatian basketball coaches
Croatian men's basketball players
Croatian expatriate basketball people in Serbia
KK Crvena zvezda players
KK Split players
OKK Beograd players
Serbian men's basketball coaches
Serbian men's basketball players
Serbs of Croatia
Sportspeople from Vukovar
Yugoslav basketball coaches
Yugoslav men's basketball players